William Macdonald (July 31, 1863 - December 15, 1938) was an American historian and journalist.

William Macdonald was from Providence, Rhode Island. He attended Harvard University, where he received a Bachelor of Arts in 1892. In 1895 he received an honorary doctorate from Union College. Macdonald's first professorship was in history and economics at Worcester Polytechnic Institute from 1892 to 1893, and he then went to Bowdoin College from 1893-01 as a professor of political science and history. From 1901 to 1917 Macdonald was a professor of history at Brown University.  Macdonald was elected a member of the American Antiquarian Society in 1902. In 1917 Macdonald resigned from Brown while on sabbatical in France. While in France he became a special foreign correspondent for The Nation and was an associate editor for the paper from 1918 to 1920. Macdonald was also an editorial writer for The Freeman and Commercial and Financial Chronicle. Macdonald gave lectures at the University of California in 1917 and 1918, and gave lectures as a visiting professor at Yale University from 1924 to 1926.

MacDonald died on December 15, 1938 in New York City.

Notes

External links

 

1863 births
1938 deaths
Harvard University alumni
Worcester Polytechnic Institute faculty
Brown University faculty
University of California, Berkeley College of Letters and Science faculty
Yale University staff
American male journalists
Members of the American Antiquarian Society
Historians from California